Ayrancı Dam is a dam in Buğdaylı Çayı, Turkey, built between 1956 and 1958.

See also
List of dams and reservoirs in Turkey

External links
DSI

Dams in Karaman Province
Dams completed in 1958